Jean-Marius Raapoto (born 1 January 1943) is a French Polynesian educator, academic, politician, and former Cabinet Minister. He has been a major advocate for the Tahitian language, and served as Minister of Education in various governments between 2004 and 2009.

He is the son of religious leader Samuel Raapoto and the brother of linguist Turo Raapoto.

Early life
Raapoto was born in Papara. After attending university in Dordogne he trained as a teacher at Normal school in Strasbourg. He worked as a teacher, then as principal of Charles Viénot school, before returning to France to pursue a degree in linguistics. He taught at Pomare IV college, before becoming its principal in 1980. He later worked for the department of education, where he was an advocate of the Tahitian language before becoming professor of Reo Mā’ohi at the University of French Polynesia. In 1996 he graduated with a doctorate in language science.

Political career
In 1985 he founded the Ea no Maohinui party, and he was elected to the Assembly of French Polynesia in the 1986 French Polynesian legislative election. He lost his seat at the 1991 election. He later formed the Tireo party. In 1998 he contested the election to the French Senate, losing to Gaston Flosse.

In June 2004 he was appointed Minister of Education in the cabinet of Oscar Temaru. He was reappointed when Temaru regained the presidency in March 2005, but surrendered his portfolio in April 2006 to return to the Assembly to shore up Temaru's majority. He was later reappointed, and oversaw the trial of English-language and te reo education to pre-schoolers.

Following the 2008 French Polynesian legislative election he was reappointed Education Minister in the coalition cabinet of Gaston Flosse, but  resigned as a Minister in April 2008 after Flosse lost a confidence vote and Gaston Tong Sang became president. He rejoined the Assembly in July 2008. He rejoined cabinet again as Education Minister when Temaru returned to power in February 2009. He was not reappointed to Temaru's fifth cabinet in 2011, instead serving as chair of the Assembly's education committee.

After retiring from politics he worked for the town of Faaa, then moved to Niau in the Tuamotus where he opened a coconut oil mill.

In 2019 he was appointed an officer of the Order of Tahiti Nui.

References

Living people
1943 births
People from Tahiti
French Polynesian academics
French Polynesian educators
French Polynesian civil servants
University of French Polynesia faculty
Members of the Assembly of French Polynesia
Education ministers of French Polynesia
Tavini Huiraatira politicians
Officers of the Order of Tahiti Nui